Mulgrave railway station is located on the Richmond line, serving the Sydney suburb of Mulgrave. It is served by Sydney Trains T1 Western and T5 Cumberland line services.

History
The original Mulgrave station opened on 1 December 1864 coinciding with that of the Richmond line. It was relocated east to its present site in 1912. In 1939, it was converted to an island platform with a passing loop added.

The station and NSW steam locomotive 3024 featured in a 1967 music video by The Seekers.

Platforms & services
Historically, Mulgrave has been served by services operating from Sydney CBD/North Shore, branching off the Western Line at Blacktown (under the service title of T1 Richmond). However, after a major timetable change for the Sydney Trains network on 26 November 2017, Cumberland line services started continuing out to Richmond, rather than terminating at Schofields, during the late night, taking over from the Richmond line at these times.

Transport links
Mulgrave station is served by one NightRide route:
N71: Richmond station to Town Hall station

References

External links

Mulgrave station details Transport for New South Wales

Railway stations in Sydney
Railway stations in Australia opened in 1864
Railway stations in Australia opened in 1939
Richmond railway line
City of Hawkesbury